The 2008–09 IRB Sevens World Series was the tenth of an annual IRB Sevens World Series of rugby union sevens tournaments for full national sides run by the International Rugby Board since 1999–2000.

South Africa clinched the 2008–09 World Series, its first Series title.  The defending series champions New Zealand finished fourth.

Sevens is traditionally played in a two-day tournament format. However, the most famous event, the Hong Kong Sevens, is played over three days, largely because it involves 24 teams instead of the normal 16. Starting in 2008–09, the Australia leg (which involves the normal 16 teams) was spread out over a three-day period.

Tournaments
The series' tournaments are identical to 2007–2008 and span the globe:

The 2009 Rugby World Cup Sevens was not a part of the 2008-09 series. Unlike the 2005 edition held in Hong Kong, the 2009 edition did not replace one of the 2008-09 series events. The World Cup was held in Dubai from March 5–7, 2009 and won by Wales.

Core teams
Prior to the season, the IRB announced the 12 "core teams" that would receive guaranteed berths in each event in the 2008–09 series:

The one new core team was the USA, which replaced its neighbor Canada.

Points schedule
The season championship is determined by points earned in each tournament. For most events, points are awarded on the following schedule:
Cup winner (1st place): 20 points
Cup runner-up (2nd place): 16 points
Losing Cup semifinalists (3rd & 4th place): 12 points
Plate winner (5th place): 8 points
Plate runner-up (6th place): 6 points
Losing Plate semifinalists (7th & 8th place): 4 points
Bowl winner (9th place): 2 points

Points are awarded on a different schedule for the Hong Kong Sevens:
Cup winner (1st place): 30 points
Cup runner-up (2nd place): 24 points
Losing Cup semifinalists (3rd & 4th place): 18 points
Losing Cup quarterfinalists (5th, 6th, 7th & 8th place): 8 points
Plate winner (9th place): 4 points
Plate runner-up (10th place): 3 points
Losing Plate semifinalists (11th & 12th place): 2 points
Bowl winner (17th place): 1 point

Tournament structure
In all tournaments except Hong Kong, 16 teams participate. Due to its place as the sports most prestigious annual event, the Hong Kong tournament has 24 teams. In each tournament, the teams are divided into pools of four teams, who play a round-robin within the pool. Points are awarded in each pool on a different schedule from most rugby tournaments–3 for a win, 2 for a draw, 1 for a loss. The first tiebreaker is the head-to-head result between the tied teams, followed by difference in points scored during the tournament.

Four trophies are awarded in each tournament, except for Hong Kong. In descending order of prestige, they are the Cup, whose winner is the overall tournament champion, Plate, Bowl and Shield. In Hong Kong, the Shield is not awarded. Each trophy is awarded at the end of a knockout tournament.

In a 16 team tournament, the top two teams in each pool advance to the Cup competition. The four quarterfinal losers drop into the bracket for the Plate. The Bowl is contested by the third-place finishers in each pool, while the Shield is contested by the last-place teams from each pool. In Hong Kong, the six pool winners, plus the two highest-finishing second-place teams, advance to the Cup. The Plate participants are the eight highest-ranked teams remaining, while the lowest eight drop to the Bowl.

Final standings
The points awarded to teams at each event, as well as the overall season totals, are shown in the table below. Points for the event winners are indicated in bold. A zero (0) is recorded in the event column where a team competed in a tournament but did not gain any points. A dash (–) is recorded in the event column if a team did not compete at a tournament.

Notes:

Light blue line on the left indicates a core team eligible to participate in all events of the series.

Player statistics

Most points

Most tries

Tournaments

Dubai

South Africa

New Zealand

United States

Hong Kong

Australia

London

Scotland

References

External links

 
World Rugby Sevens Series